"Time Is Money (Bastard)" is a song by American experimental rock band Swans. It was released as a 12-inch single in 1986, through record label K.422. The single is notable for the first official appearance of vocalist Jarboe.

Critical reception 

Trouser Press described "Time Is Money (Bastard)" as a "great single", and Ned Raggett of AllMusic called the song "an underground industrial/dance hit" and noted its aggressively explicit lyrics.

Track listing

Personnel 
 Michael Gira – vocals, production
 N. Westerg (Norman Westberg) – guitar
 Ronaldo Gonzalez – drums
 H. Crosby (Harry Crosby) – bass guitar
 Jarboe – scream
 Jorgé Estabon – engineering, production assistance
 P. White – sleeve artwork
 M.G. – album cover design

Charts

References

External links 
 

1985 songs
1986 debut singles
Swans (band) songs